Dimitrios Kougevetopoulos (25 May 1948 – 11 May 2019) was a Greek former water polo player. He competed at the 1968 Summer Olympics and the 1972 Summer Olympics. He played for Ethnikos Piraeus with whom he won multiple Greek championships from the 60s till the 80s .

References

External links
 

1948 births
Living people
Greek male water polo players
Olympic water polo players of Greece
Water polo players at the 1968 Summer Olympics
Water polo players at the 1972 Summer Olympics
Water polo players from Athens
Ethnikos Piraeus Water Polo Club players